This is a list of episodes from the animated CatDog television series.

Series overview
Sixty-eight episodes from four seasons and one made-for-TV movie, CatDog and the Great Parent Mystery, were produced.

Episodes

Season 1 (1998)

Season 2 (1999–2000) 
"Fetch" was shown on November 20, 1998 with The Rugrats Movie.

Season 3 (1999–2001)

Season 4 (2000–2005)
This season is the shortest, having 8 episodes (6 if counting CatDog and the Great Parent Mystery as one episode).

VHS tapes

Lists of American children's animated television series episodes
Lists of American comedy television series episodes
Lists of Nickelodeon television series episodes